Leucrocuta aphrodite is a species of flatheaded mayfly in the family Heptageniidae. It is found in southeastern Canada, the southern, and northeastern United States.

References

External links

 

Mayflies
Articles created by Qbugbot
Insects described in 1926